Blue Genes is an album by The Three Sounds recorded for the Verve label in late 1962.

Track listing
 "Mr. Wonderful" (Jerry Bock, George David Weiss, Larry Holofcener) − 5:28
 "Autumn in New York" (Vernon Duke) − 5:54
 "Love Somebody" (William E. Curry) − 4:08
 "Blue Genes" (Gene Harris) − 3:46
 "Red Sails in the Sunset" (Hugh Williams, Jimmy Kennedy) − 3:37
 "In a Mellow Tone" (Duke Ellington) − 4:55
 "Gina, My Love" (Harris) − 3:00
 "Whims of Chamberland" (Paul Chambers) − 3:53

Personnel
Gene Harris - piano
Andrew Simpkins - bass
Bill Dowdy - drums

References

The Three Sounds albums
1963 albums
Verve Records albums
Albums produced by Creed Taylor
Albums recorded at Van Gelder Studio